Edoardo Masciangelo (born 8 July 1996) is an Italian professional footballer who plays as a left-back for  club Palermo, on loan from Benevento.

Club career
Masciangelo is a youth product of the Roma and Fiorentina youth academies. He joined Arezzo in the Serie C, and after 2 seasons joined Piacenza in 2017.

After a successful 2017–18 season with Piacenza where he was considered one of the best young players in the Serie C, Masciangelo transferred to FC Lugano in the Swiss Super League. Masciangelo made his professional debut for Lugano in a 2–1 Swiss Super League win over FC Sion on 22 July 2018.

On 27 January 2019, Masciangelo joined to Juventus U23 on loan with an obligation to buy until 30 June 2019.

After Juventus bought out his rights, on 30 August 2019 he joined Pescara on loan. On 24 January 2020, Pescara made the transfer permanent.

On 21 July 2021, he joined Benevento on loan with an obligation to buy.

On 31 January 2023, Masciangelo was loaned out to fellow Serie B club Palermo until the end of the season, with an option to buy.

References

External links
 
 SFL Profile
 
 Piacenza Profile

1996 births
Living people
Footballers from Rome
Italian footballers
Association football defenders
Serie B players
Serie C players
A.S. Roma players
ACF Fiorentina players
S.S. Arezzo players
Piacenza Calcio 1919 players
Juventus Next Gen players
Delfino Pescara 1936 players
Benevento Calcio players
Palermo F.C. players
Swiss Super League players
FC Lugano players
Italian expatriate footballers
Italian expatriate sportspeople in Switzerland
Expatriate footballers in Switzerland